The 2000 Japanese Grand Prix (formally the XXVI Fuji Television Japanese Grand Prix) was a Formula One motor race held on 8 October 2000, at the Suzuka International Racing Course in Suzuka, Mie, Japan in front of a crowd of 151,000 spectators. It was the 16th and penultimate round of the 2000 Formula One World Championship, as well as, the 26th Japanese Grand Prix. Ferrari driver Michael Schumacher won the 53-lap race from pole position. Mika Häkkinen finished second in a McLaren with teammate David Coulthard third. Schumacher's victory confirmed him as the 2000 World Drivers' Champion, as Häkkinen could not overtake Schumacher's points total with one race remaining in the season.

Going to the race, only Michael Schumacher and Häkkinen were in contention for the World Drivers' Championship, with Schumacher holding an eight-point lead. Ferrari led McLaren by ten points in the World Constructors' Championship. Häkkinen started the Grand Prix alongside Michael Schumacher on the grid's front row. Michael Schumacher attempted to defend his lead off the line by moving into Häkkinen's path, but Häkkinen passed Michael Schumacher approaching the first corner, with Coulthard holding off attempts by Williams driver Ralf Schumacher to move into third position. Michael Schumacher managed to close the gap to Häkkinen by lap 31 and passed the latter during the second round of pit stops. He maintained the advantage between himself and Häkkinen towards the end of the race to secure his eighth victory of the season.

Michael Schumacher received praise from many within the Formula One community, including former Champion Jody Scheckter and Ferrari president Luca di Montezemolo, though he was criticised by former Italian president Francesco Cossiga for his conduct during the playing of the Italian National Anthem on the podium. The Ferrari driver also received predominant congratulations from the European press. Häkkinen's second-place finish secured him second position in the Drivers' Championship, while Ferrari extended the gap to McLaren in the World Constructors' Championship to thirteen points, with one race remaining in the season.

Background
The 2000 Japanese Grand Prix was the sixteenth and penultimate round of the 2000 Formula One World Championship and was staged at the  clockwise figure-of-eight Suzuka International Racing Course in Suzuka, Mie, Japan on 8 October 2000. The Grand Prix was contested by eleven teams (each representing a different constructor) of two drivers each and there were no changes from the season entry list. Sole tyre supplier Bridgestone brought the Medium dry compound and the intermediate and full wet-weather compounds to the event. A minor change was made to the circuit ahead of the Grand Prix. The pit lane entry was moved from the end of the 130R left-hand corner to the exit of the Casio chicane to try to improve safety.

Going into the race, Ferrari driver Michael Schumacher led the World Drivers' Championship with 88 points, ahead of the McLaren duo of Mika Häkkinen on 80 points and David Coulthard on 63. Ferrari's Rubens Barrichello was fourth on 55 points, with Williams' Ralf Schumacher fifth on 24 points. A maximum of 20 points were available for the final two races, which meant Häkkinen could still win the title. Michael Schumacher had to win the race, regardless of Häkkinen's finishing position, since he would be more than ten points ahead of Häkkinen with one race remaining. Otherwise, Häkkinen could win the Championship in the final race of the season in Malaysia by out-scoring Schumacher. In the event of a points tie, Michael Schumacher would win the Championship on count-back, having more wins. In the World Constructors' Championship, Ferrari were leading on 143 points, McLaren and Williams were second and third on 133 and 34 points respectively. Benetton with 20 points were fourth with Jordan fifth with 17 points.

With two races of the season remaining and an eight-point deficit after losing the lead in the Drivers' Championship, Häkkinen remained confident about his title chances: "I know that what happened to me in the last Grand Prix, when I had to retire, can happen to anyone, It could happen to Michael. So I am very optimistic. I have come here prepared and thinking about these two races together. Not one, two." He approached the event in the same way as the others. Michael Schumacher had won the preceding two races, and emphasised the pressure of leading the championship going into Japan: "It hasn't been a relaxing time at all and I still haven't completely got over the jetlag from the States. But I'm prepared to sacrifice this and a lot more to bring the title back to Maranello. And the same can be said of the entire team." Ferrari team principal Jean Todt and former World Champion Jody Scheckter called for Barrichello and Coulthard to race fairly as both drivers were ordered by their teams to assist their teammates in the Championship battle.

Following the United States Grand Prix on 24 September, the teams conducted testing sessions at various racing circuits across Europe between 26 and 29 September to prepare for the Grand Prix. McLaren's test driver Olivier Panis flew to the Circuit de Nevers Magny-Cours to undertake preparations for Suzuka and development work on their 2001 car. Ferrari test driver Luca Badoer spent two days at the Fiorano Circuit testing mechanical components and ran on an artificially wet track for testing of Bridgestone's wet weather tyre compounds. Williams, with rookie competitor Jenson Button, went to the Circuito do Estoril for two days and tried wet weather tyres and different aerodynamic configurations. Prost travelled to Magny-Cours and their test driver Stéphane Sarrazin collected three days of chassis design data for the upcoming AP04 chassis. Benetton opted to not test but their test driver Mark Webber tried developments at the Circuit de Catalunya that were incorporated into their 2001 car.

At the drivers meeting held the Friday afternoon before the event, the Fédération Internationale de l'Automobile (FIA) Race Director Charlie Whiting announced that any potential blocking manoeuvres that interfered with the World Championship battle would result in a driver being shown a waved black and white flag to indicate unsportsmanlike conduct, before giving a black flag to signal disqualification from the race. The penalty also had a potential ban for up to three Formula One World Championship events for any driver found to have breached the new ruling. Ralf Schumacher agreed with the penalties. However, McLaren team principal Ron Dennis was more vocal in opposing the new rules as he believed they were arbitrary and were against choosing team tactics. He was also unhappy with the inclusion of Italian lawyer Roberto Causo as a race steward because Dennis held the view that any decision would be biased towards Ferrari.

Some teams had made modifications to their cars in preparation for the event but, with two races of the season remaining, several squads instead focused on developing the cars that they would enter for the 2001 season. Ferrari introduced a new rectangular shaped front wing to replace their arrow-shaped front wing. Honda introduced a more powerful version of its V10 engine for Saturday's qualifying session and the race. Sauber brought lighter components to reduce the weight of their cars and the Williams team arrived with a revised rear wing. Williams engine suppliers BMW confirmed that they would be running the same specification of engine introduced in Belgium.

Practice
A total of four practice sessions preceded Sunday's race—two one-hour sessions on Friday, and two 45-minute sessions on Saturday. The Friday morning and afternoon sessions were held in dry and warm weather. Several drivers immediately ventured onto the circuit for car checks since teams were not permitted to test at Suzuka. Michael Schumacher was fastest in the first practice session with a time of 1 minute and 38.474 seconds that he recorded with two minutes remaining, ahead of Häkkinen and Coulthard in second and third places. Barrichello, fourth, caused the session to be yellow flagged when he spun at the hairpin between turns ten and eleven and crashed into the perimeter fencing. Ralf Schumacher was fifth fastest, with Benetton's Giancarlo Fisichella sixth. Heinz-Harald Frentzen and Jarno Trulli set the seventh and ninth fastest times respectively for Jordan; they were separated by Jaguar's Eddie Irvine. Jacques Villeneuve of the BAR team was tenth despite a spin off the circuit at Degner Curve at  that caused grass to penetrate his radiators.

In the second practice session, Michael Schumacher set the day's fastest lap, a 1:37.728, six-tenths of a second faster than Häkkinen. Barrichello had trouble selecting first gear on his final run although he improved his lap to be third-quickest. Coulthard, Button, Frentzen, Trulli, Arrows driver Pedro de la Rosa, Villeneuve and BAR's Ricardo Zonta were in positions four through ten. Villeneuve had his second spin of the day, when he lost control of his car at Spoon Kurve turn on his final lap. He hit the barrier with his car's right-front wheel. Just after halfway through the session while cars were being driven on the track, an earthquake measuring 7.1 on the richter scale with the epicentre in the city of Okayama was felt at Suzuka, although no structural damage to the circuit was reported and no one was injured despite mild alarm.

The weather remained dry and warm for the Saturday morning practice sessions. Michael Schumacher again lapped fastest for the third session, a 1:37.176, quicker than his best on Friday. The Williams drivers were running quicker; Ralf Schumacher in second and Button in fourth. They were separated by Coulthard in third who went wide at the exit of Spoon Curve corner and returned to the circuit after driving into the gravel. Fisichella set the fifth quickest lap, ahead of Villeneuve in sixth, who spun into the gravel at the hairpin late on and had to walk to the pit lane. Barrichello, Irvine, Jaguar's Johnny Herbert and De La Rosa completed the top ten. The engine in Pedro Diniz's Sauber car failed ten minutes into practice; smoke and fire billowed from the rear of his car and a large amount of oil was laid on the circuit. He returned to the pit lane rather than stop at the side of the track. Some drivers slid on the oil.

Häkkinen set the final practice session's quickest lap of 1:37.037 with 15 minutes remaining, going one-tenth of a second faster than Michael Schumacher. Button, third, was happy with his car's performance. Barrichello maintained his consistent performance and set the fourth fastest time despite again spinning into the gravel traps. He was ahead of Ralf Schumacher who had his fastest lap time that was quickest overall revoked after exceeding track limits at the chicane when he braked too late with ten minutes left. Coulthard was sixth, two-tenths of a second faster than Fisichella in seventh. Irvine, Benetton's Alexander Wurz and Villeneuve made up positions eight through ten. Irvine had a car throttle system fault and ran wide into the gravel at the Spoon Curve corner. He used the perimeter of the gravel to rejoin the track. Villeneuve had his fourth spin into the gravel trap but was able to return to the circuit.

Qualifying

Saturday's afternoon one hour qualifying session saw each driver was limited to twelve laps, with the starting order decided by their fastest laps. During this session, the 107% rule was in effect, which necessitated each driver set a time within 107 per cent of the quickest lap to qualify for the race. The session was held in dry weather. Michael Schumacher was sent into a gap in traffic by Ferrari technical director Ross Brawn, and took his eighth pole position of the season, the 31st of his Formula One career, with a lap of 1:35.825 that he set with three minutes remaining. He was joined on the grid's front row by Häkkinen, who was nine thousands of a second slower than Schumacher and battled him for grid position throughout qualifying. Häkkinen's teammate Coulthard qualified third, having closed up to the fastest two qualifiers during the session. He conceded that he was not quick enough to challenge for pole position after making some car adjustments. The two Williams drivers qualified on the grid's third row; Button in fifth was ahead of Ralf Schumacher in sixth. Both drivers had mixed feelings over their performance; Ralf Schumacher was unable to deal with setup changes to his car. Button's first two timed laps were impeded by Häkkinen and Trulli respectively and he lapped fastest at his third attempt. Irvine in seventh was slow to enter certain corners and had brake problems. Frentzen, eighth, reported driving a difficult-handling car.

Villeneuve, ninth, had excess oversteer and failed to lap faster due to car alterations. Herbert, tenth, felt he could have qualified on the fourth row after a setup adjustment. Wurz in eleventh failed to qualify in the top ten by nearly two thousands of a second due to a lack of top speed. His teammate Fisichella started twelfth, reporting his car lost performance after morning practice. Both Arrows drivers were on the grid's seventh row–De La Rosa was faster than Verstappen–and were affected by water leak, electrical and hydraulic problems on the cars limiting their running. Trulli, 15th, had car power steering issues in high-speed corners and poor car balance. Heidfeld qualified 16th, ahead of Prost teammate Jean Alesi. Zonta had limited qualifying time due to an engine change and was 18th. Sauber took the grid's tenth row, Mika Salo in front of Diniz, who had a lack of traction and an understeer. Salo used the spare Sauber vehicle setup for Diniz because his race car had a broken electrical connection. Both of Diniz's two fastest qualifying times were disallowed because of him laying oil on the circuit and not stopping on the circuit in the morning practice sessions. The two Minardi drivers qualified at the rear of the grid with Marc Gené in 21st ahead of Gastón Mazzacane in 22nd. Gené drove the spare Minardi car due to a sudden gearbox oil temperature rise and Mazzacane made an error during the first third of his lap.

Qualifying classification

Warm-up
The drivers took to the track at 10:00 Japan Standard Time (UTC +9) for a 30-minute warm-up session. It took place in cloudy weather and small drops of rain fell before the commencement of the session. This made the circuit damp but it dried up quickly and teams switched from wet to dry compound tyres. Teams fine-tuned the handling of their cars while running heavy fuel loads as competitors practised their starts. Michael Schumacher set the fastest overall lap of 1:38.005 on his last quick effort. His teammate Barrichello was third in the other Ferrari car. They were split by the McLaren drivers—Häkkinen was second with Coulthard fourth. Button set the fifth-quickest lap. With ten minutes of the session remaining, Mazzacane lost control of his car in the final curve of the esses behind the pit lane, sustaining heavy vehicular damage against the barrier.

Race

The race started at 14:30 local time. The conditions for the race were dry and overcast for the race; forecasters predicted rain during the event. Approximately 151,000 people attended the race. During the final parade lap, Häkkinen's car developed an leak in the hydraulic system which caused smoke to depart but managed to take the start. Frentzen started the race using Jordan's spare monocoque. When the lights went out to start the Grand Prix, Häkkinen accelerated faster than Michael Schumacher off the line with more track grip, withstanding the German's attempts to maintain the lead by veering right towards the McLaren car in an attempt to block his path into the first corner. Whiting decided not to wave the black and white diagonal flag for poor driving standards. Behind the leading two drivers on the approach into the first corner, Michael Schumacher's manoeuvre created some action, as Ralf Schumacher overtook Barrichello and Coulthard withstood Schumacher's attempts to pass for third position. Verstappen moved from 14th to tenth at the end of the first lap, while Fisichella made a slow getaway, losing eight positions over the same distance; the result of his anti-stall system activating.

At the completion of lap one, Häkkinen led from Michael Schumacher by eight-tenths of a second, followed by Coulthard, Ralf Schumacher, Irvine, Barrichello and Button. Häkkinen set the fastest lap of the race on lap two and began to maintain the gap between himself and Michael Schumacher as both drivers pulled away from the rest of the field. A minor drizzle fell on the circuit on the fourth lap but it was not heavy enough to effect the race. Villeneuve moved into eighth place when he passed Herbert on lap seven, while Trulli passed his teammate Frentzen from 11th position. Verstappen became the race's first retirement when he coasted across the circuit with electronic gearbox problems on lap ten and was pushed into the garage. Diniz made his first pit stop on lap 13, starting the first round of pit stops. At the front of the field, Häkkinen increased the gap between himself and Michael Schumacher to two seconds, who in turn was a further ten seconds ahead of Coulthard in third. Ralf Schumacher was a further 8.8 seconds behind Coulthard, but was drawing ahead of Irvine in fifth. Further back, Trulli made a pit stop from tenth position on lap 17 due to him being fuelled light to gain track position. He emerged in 18th position. Irvine became the first of the front runners to make a pit stop on the following lap and emerged behind Frentzen. Wurz, Herbert, Salo and Heidfeld all made pit stops on lap 19, while Trulli lost time after going off the track. On the 20th lap, Ralf Schumacher, Villeneuve, Frentzen, De La Rosa and Fisichella made their first pit stops. Barrichello and Button made pit stops on the following lap, and rejoined ahead of Irvine. Alesi retired from the race with an engine failure that dropped oil on the circuit and he spun on the circuit at either turns four or five on lap 21. Häkkinen was asked by his team to make a pit stop earlier than scheduled on lap 22. Michael Schumacher led one lap before Brawn called him into the pit lane for extra fuel on lap 23. He fell behind Häkkinen since his pit stop was slightly longer. Coulthard led a single lap before he made his first pit stop on lap 24, relinquishing the lead to teammate Häkkinen. On the same lap, Villeneuve passed Irvine into turn 16 for seventh position.

All of the drivers had made pit stops by the end of lap 25. The race order was Häkkinen, Michael Schumacher, Coulthard, Barrichello, Ralf Schumacher, and Button. Häkkinen set a new fastest lap of the race on lap 26, a 1:39.189, as he built a gap between himself and Michael Schumacher to 2.9 seconds. Trulli became the first driver to make a second pit stop on lap 28. Light rain began to fall on lap 30 and the track started to become slippery. The gap between Häkkinen and Michael Schumacher fell by one second after the McLaren driver was slowed by traffic on the same lap. Lap times slowed from then on due to the track becoming slippery. Ralf Schumacher lost sixth to teammate Button after making an error on the same lap, while Frentzen pulled off the track at the entry of First Curve to retire with a hydraulic pump issue which caused his gearbox to fail. Michael Schumacher closed to 0.7 seconds behind Häkkinen by lap 31, although he narrowly avoided hitting Zonta who went off the racing line to allow Schumacher to lap him on the entry to the chicane two laps later. Further back, Heidfeld overtook Trulli for 13th on lap 34.

The second round of pit stops began on the same lap when Irvine made a pit stop. Häkkinen made his second stop on lap 37, and exited the pit lane 25.8 seconds behind Michael Schumacher but ahead of Coulthard. Michael Schumacher began to immediately pull away from Häkkinen; he radioed Brawn that he was approaching slower cars and asked whether he should make his final pit stop earlier than scheduled. Brawn told Michael Schumacher to remain on the circuit for the time being. Coulthard, Barrichello and Button remained in third, fourth and fifth positions respectively, during their second stops on lap 38 and 39. Wurz retired after spinning sideways exiting the chicane on lap 40. Michael Schumacher missed Wurz's stationary vehicle, and lost time manoeuvring past it.  Wurz then reversed backwards as Häkkinen went by. Schumacher made his final pit stop on the same lap, emerging 4.1 seconds in front of Häkkinen, due to a pit stop lasting 1.2 seconds less than Häkkinen's and him gaining five seconds on the McLaren driver despite encountering both Jaguars and Wurz. Ralf Schumacher became the race's sixth retirement when he lost control of the rear of his car mounting a kerb and spun into the gravel trap when trying to lap Gené at turn two on lap 42. This promoted Villeneuve to the final points-scoring position of sixth. Heidfeld became the final driver to make a scheduled pit stop on the same lap.

At the conclusion of lap 42, with the scheduled pit stops completed, the top six in the running order was Michael Schumacher, Häkkinen, Coulthard, Barrichello, Button, and Villeneuve. Heidfeld retired with a left-front suspension component failure on lap 43 as De La Rosa passed Fisichella for 13th position on the same lap. Fisichella was forced onto the gravel to avoid contact. The rain slightly increased in intensity three laps later and both Michael Schumacher and Häkkinen became more circumspect. De La Rosa overtook Trulli during the 48th lap. Gené became the race's final retirement with an expired engine at the hairpin on that lap. Michael Schumacher won the 2000 Drivers' Championship as Häkkinen could not catch his points total in the one remaining race. He also became Ferrari's first World Drivers' Champion since Jody Scheckter in 1979. Häkkinen finished second, 1.8 seconds behind, ahead of teammate Coulthard in third with Barrichello fourth. Button came fifth and was gaining on Barrichello by the finish. Villeneuve completed the points scorers in sixth. Herbert, Irvine, Zonta, Salo, Diniz, De La Rosa, Trulli, Fisichella and Mazzacane were the final classified finishers.

Post-race
The top three drivers appeared on the podium to collect their trophies and in the subsequent press conference. Michael Schumacher revealed that he took a cautious approach when the track became slippery due to rain in the second stint. He also added his team made adjustments during the first stop which helped to contribute to his quick pace. Häkkinen congratulated Michael Schumacher on clinching the Drivers' Championship and said that although he felt naturally disappointed, he admitted that "to be a good winner, sometimes you also have to be a good loser". He also confirmed that Ferrari's strategy lost him the chance of victory and acknowledged that Schumacher was at an advantage after his second pit stop. Coulthard described his race as "quiet" because of the lack of action he encountered. He also admitted that he struggled to handle the car in the wet conditions.

Michael Schumacher's title triumph was well received in the Formula One paddock and in the media. German national newspaper Die Welt said: "A dream has been fulfilled and it will have far-reaching consequences. Ferrari and Formula One are alive again in this season and a new monument has been created ...Hard work and self-sacrifice have been rewarded." In Italy, events were held across the country to celebrate Michael Schumacher's championship victory. Candido Cannavò, director of the Italian sports newspaper La Gazzetta dello Sport described the moment as: "On the dawn of a luminous autumn Sunday Ferrari reconciled itself with history."

Ferrari president Luca di Montezemolo described Michael Schumacher's title victory as the "most beautiful day of my life". He further dedicated the championship to the Ferrari team, their worldwide fan base, Ferrari's majority owner FIAT, and the team's sponsors and suppliers for their continued support. Former World Champion Scheckter praised both Ferrari and Michael Schumacher, though he expressed disappointment at losing his status as the final World Champion for Ferrari. Todt said Ferrari would not become fully satisfied until they had won the World Constructors' Championship: "We need three points for the constructors' title and we won't let go. But let's not worry about the future right now. Let's enjoy the present for at least five minutes." However, the former President of Italy Francesco Cossiga criticised Michael Schumacher's conduct during the Italian National Anthem where the German traditionally imitated a conductor when it was heard. Michael Schumacher's response was that he meant no offence and insisted that he was respectful to the national anthem.

Off track, the argument over the new rules implemented at the Grand Prix and the inclusion of lawyer Roberto Causo as a race steward was renewed. FIA president Max Mosley published a letter dated from 19 October to Ron Dennis which accused him of damaging the image of Formula One with his recent stream of comments over the issues. Mosley also defended Race Director Charlie Whiting's announcement that marshals could use racing flags to caution drivers over unsportsmanlike behaviour. Dennis responded by apologising for his comments, saying that he did not intend to bring Formula One into disrepute and cause disrespect to Causo. "It certainly has not ever been my intention to damage a sport to which I have devoted most of my working life." he said. Button was praised for his performance in the changeable conditions that saw him finish fifth by Williams technical director Patrick Head, who said: "He drove an absolutely brilliant, very mature race and thoroughly deserved fifth position."

As a consequence of the final results of the Grand Prix, Michael Schumacher won the World Drivers' Championship with a twelve-point gap over Häkkinen in second position, who in turn was confirmed as the runner-up in the Championship. Coulthard maintained third with 67 points, nine points ahead of Barrichello, and 43 in front of Ralf Schumacher. In the World Constructors' Championship, Ferrari increased their lead to thirteen points. Williams, with 36 points, increased the gap to Benetton in fourth place by 16 points, while BAR passed Jordan for fifth position on 18 points, with one race of the season remaining.

Race classification
Drivers who scored championship points are denoted in bold.

Championship standings after the race 
Bold text indicates who still has a theoretical chance of becoming World Champion.

Drivers' Championship standings

Constructors' Championship standings

Note: Only the top five positions are included for both sets of standings.

Notes

References

Japanese Grand Prix
Japanese Grand Prix
Grand Prix
Japanese Grand Prix